Sarconeurum is a genus of mosses belonging to the family Pottiaceae.

The species of this genus are found in Antarctica and Southern America.

Species:
 Sarconeurum antarcticum Bryhn
 Sarconeurum glaciale Cardot & Bryhn, 1907

References

Pottiaceae
Moss genera